Stephanie Cain (born 4 June 1996) is an Australian rules footballer who played for the Fremantle Football Club in the AFL Women's competition. Cain was drafted by Fremantle with their 14th selection and 109th overall in the 2016 AFL Women's draft. She played every match in her debut season except for the Round 5 match  against due to being omitted, and finished with six matches. She was delisted at the end of the 2017 season. In October she was subsequently redrafted by Fremantle with their first pick in the 2017 draft.

Cain ruptured the anterior cruciate ligament in her left knee in the opening quarter of the first game of the 2020 AFL Women's season, causing her to miss the remainder of the season.

References

External links 

1996 births
Living people
Fremantle Football Club (AFLW) players
Australian rules footballers from Western Australia
Essendon Football Club (AFLW) players